The 1972 WFA Cup Final was the 2nd final of the WFA Cup, England's primary cup competition for women's football teams. The showpiece event was played under the auspices of the Women's Football Association (WFA).

Match

Summary

Southampton Women's F.C. won the match 3-2.

Bibliography

References

External links
 
 Report at WomensFACup.co.uk

Cup
Women's FA Cup finals
WFA Cup Final